Dalibor Šamšal (born 25 December 1985) is a Croatian-Hungarian alpine skier. He has represented Croatia at the 2006 Winter Olympics, 2010 Winter Olympics and the 2014 Winter Olympics and Hungary at the 2018 Winter Olympics.

World Cup results

Season standings

Results per discipline

 standings through 20 Jan 2019

World Championship results

Olympic results

References

External links

 

1985 births
Sportspeople from Rijeka
Living people
Hungarian male alpine skiers
Croatian male alpine skiers
Olympic alpine skiers of Hungary
Olympic alpine skiers of Croatia
Croatian emigrants to Hungary
Alpine skiers at the 2006 Winter Olympics
Alpine skiers at the 2010 Winter Olympics
Alpine skiers at the 2014 Winter Olympics
Alpine skiers at the 2018 Winter Olympics